Pranburi (Thai ปราณบุรี) may refer to:
Pran Buri District and town, Prachuap Khiri Khan Province, Thailand
Pranburi River, which flows through the district
Pranburi Forest Park, at the mouth of the Pranburi river

See also
Pranburia, a genus of corinnid sac spiders